The Irving M. Klein International String Competition is recognized as the world's leading competition for young string musicians  and one of the most prestigious international events. It is open to young musicians, ages fifteen to twenty-three, and takes place every June in San Francisco, California.  The competition was founded in 1985.

The format of the competition is that each entrant (no more than twelve, selected from among many taped applications) performs a twenty-minute recital on the first day. The judges select up to five finalists who play longer programs on the second day. The judges then select the top three to perform full concertos with orchestra on the final evening of the competition. The performances are open to the public and attract an enthusiastic and supportive audience.

Prize Winners
Past winners of the competition:

Trivia

In the book The Eggnog Chronicles, one fictional character is introduced as "the youngest violinist to win the Irving M. Klein String Competition."

References

External links
 Official Site

Violin competitions
Music competitions in the United States